William E. Wirth (born June 23, 1962) is an American actor, film producer, and artist, perhaps best known for his role as Dwayne in the 1987 film, The Lost Boys.

Life and career

Wirth was born in New York City to a lawyer father and an artist mother. His paternal grandparents were Russian Jewish immigrants. His mother, who was born in Iowa, had Native American, English, Scottish and Irish ancestry.

He was a student at Collegiate School, where he was a classmate of musician John Hermann, and attended Brown University, where he was discovered by photographer Karen Michele, while they were both in their teens. Karen Michele went on to have a career in photography and Billy used the first headshots Karen took to begin a modeling career in New York. He moved to California in the 1980s to pursue an acting career, which began with a role in the 1985 feature, Seven Minutes in Heaven. His performance as Dwayne in The Lost Boys followed, and he landed a starring role in the 1988 film War Party.

Wirth continued acting, working in both film and television, appearing for example in Abel Ferrara's 1993 film Body Snatchers as well as Sex and the City and CSI. He took part in the television series American Gladiators, competing during the series' first season in 1989 and advancing to the first-half semifinals before falling. He also starred in Charmed as Matthew Tate. Since 1999, he has been writing, directing, and producing independent films. His work on directing, writing, and producing his 2001 film MacArthur Park has earned him several award nominations. In addition to his work in the film industry, Wirth is a musician and artist.

Filmography

Film and TV credits

Awards
Sundance Film Festival

Taos Talking Picture Festival

References

External links
 

1962 births
Living people
20th-century American male actors
21st-century American male actors
American male film actors
American male television actors
American Gladiators contestants
Male actors from New York City
Collegiate School (New York) alumni